ITW may refer to:

 Illinois Tool Works
 International Thriller Writers
 Institute of Technology for Women, former name of the Usha Mittal Institute of Technology
 Inter Air (ICAO airline code: ITW; callsign: INTER WINGS), see List of airline codes (I)
 Ibuoro language (ISO 639 language code: itw)
 idiopathic toe walking, a form of toe walking
 Income Tax Withholding (ITW), a type of notation found on Australian business activity statements
 Informations Télédiffusion Webmedia (ITW), french media

See also

 IWT (disambiguation)
 WTI (disambiguation)
 wit (disambiguation)
 tiw (disambiguation)
 TWI (disambiguation)